Saint Zoilus (died 304 AD) is venerated as a saint by the Catholic Church.  Christian tradition states that he was a young man martyred with nineteen others at Córdoba, Spain under Diocletian.

Veneration
His name is mentioned by Prudentius and his name appears in the Martyrologium Hieronymianum as well as the Roman Martyrology.

Their relics were enshrined at the abbey named after him: the Benedictine abbey of San Zoilo de Carrión at Carrión de los Condes, in the Province of Palencia.  There was also a monastery near Córdoba dedicated to him.  Some of the subsequent Martyrs of Córdoba were associated with this monastery.

His feast was also celebrated at Chester; he was anciently and incorrectly considered to have reigned by the city's inhabitants.

References

Saints of June 27: Zoilus and Companions

Saints from Hispania
304 deaths
4th-century Christian martyrs
4th-century Romans
People from Córdoba, Spain
Year of birth unknown